Ta Meun is a khum (commune) of Thma Koul District in Battambang Province in north-western Cambodia.

Villages
Ta Meun contains ten villages.

References

Communes of Battambang province
Thma Koul District